Anselmo Silvino (born 23 November 1945) is a retired Italian middleweight weightlifter. He won bronze medals at the 1972 Summer Olympics, 1971 and 1972 world championships, and 1972 European Championships.

References

External links
 
 
 

1945 births
Living people
Italian male weightlifters
Olympic weightlifters of Italy
Weightlifters at the 1968 Summer Olympics
Weightlifters at the 1972 Summer Olympics
Olympic bronze medalists for Italy
Olympic medalists in weightlifting
Medalists at the 1972 Summer Olympics
20th-century Italian people